Papadates or Pappadates may refer to several places in Greece:

Papadates, Aetolia-Acarnania, a village in Aetolia-Acarnania
Pappadates, Preveza, a village in the municipality of Ziros, Preveza regional unit